Hertford Cowbridge railway station was a station on the Hertford and Welwyn Junction Railway, and was situated in Hertford, England.

History

The station was opened on 1 March 1858, originally being named Hertford Cowbridge.

On 1 July 1923, the station was renamed Hertford North, but did not last long under that name. When the Hertford Loop Line opened on 2 June 1924, a new  station was opened on that line, the old one being closed the same day.

Route

Notes

References

External links
Site of Hertford Cowbridge on a navigable 1946 O.S. map

Disused railway stations in Hertfordshire
Former Great Northern Railway stations
Railway stations in Great Britain opened in 1858
Railway stations in Great Britain closed in 1924
Buildings and structures in Hertford